GuidePal is a mobile app that makes it possible for content creators to earn money by recommending their favorite places and experiences to their followers – without the involvement of brands or advertisers.

GuidePal was founded in 2021. The company's head office is based in New York, United States.

Overview
GuidePal believes that artists and creators deserve to get paid for the value they bring the world, which is why GuidePal brings creators and fans closer together and gives creators a new way to earn money while sharing personal and exciting content with their fans — without bombarding the world with more ads. 

ALL GUIDEPAL USERS 

• Browse and preview guides from different creators 

• Each guide contains up to 15 recommendations with photos, videos, text, quotes, and audio. 

• Unlock full access to any guide through in-app purchases ($1.99 USD) 

• Save liked guides and recommendations in a folder on your profile, so you can revisit them later 

• Explore the places you discover on a map 

CREATORS 

• Use our easy & intuitive guide editor tool to create guides to your special interests 

• Easily share your guides to your followers on your social media channels 

• As people start to pay to unlock full access to your guides, you can monitor your earnings & stats on your dashboard and insights page

To start creating your own guides, you need a personal invitation or you can apply in the app to become a GuidePal creator. Visit www.guidepal.com/creators to learn more.

References

External links 
 GuidePal

Companies based in Stockholm
Publishing companies established in 2009
City guides
Swedish companies established in 2009